New Zealand is a hamlet in the civil parish of Hilmarton in Wiltshire, England.

The hamlet is almost certainly named for the local connection to the country: John Dickson-Poynder was Governor of New Zealand in 1910–12, and the Hilmarton estate was the Poynder family seat.

Today the hamlet is close to the southern boundary of MoD Lyneham, which was opened as RAF Lyneham in 1940.

References

External links 

Hamlets in Wiltshire